Agony is a British sitcom that aired on ITV from 1979 to 1981. Made by London Weekend Television, it stars Maureen Lipman as Jane Lucas who has a successful career as an agony aunt but whose own personal life is a shambles. It was created by Len Richmond and real-life agony aunt Anna Raeburn, both of whom wrote all of the first series. The second and third series were written by Stan Hey and Andrew Nickolds.

Agony was the first British sitcom to portray a gay couple as non-camp, witty, intelligent and happy people.

Cast
Maureen Lipman - Jane Lucas
Simon Williams - Laurence Lucas
Maria Charles - Bea Fisher
Peter Blake - Andy Evol
Jeremy Bulloch - Rob
Peter Denyer - Michael
Diana Weston - Val Dunn
Jan Holden - Diana
Robert Gillespie - Mr. Mince (Series 1)
Robert Austin - Junior Truscombe (series 2 and 3)
Bill Nighy - Vincent Fish (series 2)
Josephine Welcome - Indira Patel (Series 2)

Premise
Jane Lucas is an agony aunt, who is highly successful in her career working at radio call-in show (for Happening Radio 242) in London and writing the "Dear Jane" advice column for Person magazine, but whose own marriage and personal life is a complete disaster. Her Jewish mother, Bea, interferes in all aspects of her life, and her gentile psychiatrist husband Laurence is unreliable and emotionally inept during the course of their on/off relationship. Jane's friends and colleagues include her assistant Val, her boss Diana, and her gay neighbours Rob and Michael, all of whom come to her with problems of their own. Meanwhile, Jane has to contend with the constant advances of oversexed, smarmy radio disc jockey Andy Evol and the equally libidinous Vincent Fish.

Although a sitcom, Agony often included subjects in its storylines that were considered taboo at the time such as drug use, racism, and homosexuality, and often included darker, more dramatic storylines such as Jane being held hostage by a crazed maniac, the suicide of one of her friends, and the abduction of her newborn baby.

Reception
Writing in The Guardian, television critic Nancy Banks-Smith praised the series, describing it as "a wide-awake, wise-cracking comedy with a cracking good comedienne in Maureen Lipman" and that "the one-liners are one a second, fast and fresh and funny."

Episodes

Series One (1979)
"Help" (11 March 1979)
"An Unmarried Couple" (18 March 1979)
"Conjugal Wrongs" (25 March 1979)
"Wedlock, Deadlock" (8 April 1979)
"Forever and Never" (15 April 1979)
"Too Much Agony, Too Little Ecstasy" (29 April 1979)

Series Two (1980)
"Back to Reality" (13 April 1980)
"Working Girls" (20 April 1980)
"Coming Out... and Going In Again?" (27 April 1980)
"Television Can Damage Your Health" (4 May 1980)
"Problem Parents" (11 May 1980)
"Second Time Around" (18 May 1980)
"A Woman Alone" (25 May 1980)

Series Three (1981)
"From Here to Maternity" (18 January 1981)
"Arrivals and Departures" (25 January 1981)
"Hospital Romances" (1 February 1981)
"Communications Breakdown" (8 February 1981)
"Holy Wars" (15 February 1981)
"Lucas v Lucas" (22 February 1981)
"Rings Off Their Fingers" (1 March 1981)

Agony Again

Agony was revived in 1995, this time on the BBC as Agony Again; produced by the BBC after ITV turned it down; the revived version had originally been pitched to Radio 4, but was felt to have enough potential to again be a television production. In addition, Agony was remade for American television under the name The Lucie Arnaz Show, with Len Richmond as the writer. This ran for six episodes on CBS in 1985 and starred Lucie Arnaz.

DVD releases
All three series of Agony, including a 3-disc set of the complete series, have been released on DVD in the UK (Region 2) by Network DVD.

References

Mark Lewisohn, "Radio Times Guide to TV Comedy", BBC Worldwide Ltd, 2003

External links
Agony at TV Ark

1979 British television series debuts
1981 British television series endings
1970s British sitcoms
1970s British LGBT-related television series
1980s British LGBT-related television series
1980s British sitcoms
Kidnapping in television
British LGBT-related sitcoms
English-language television shows
ITV sitcoms
Television series about Jews and Judaism
London Weekend Television shows
Suicide in television
Television shows set in London
Television series about radio
1970s LGBT-related sitcoms
1980s LGBT-related sitcoms